The 2019 Waterford Senior Hurling Championship is the 119th staging of the Waterford Senior Hurling Championship since its establishment by the Waterford County Board in 1897. The championship began on 6 April 2019 and is scheduled to end on 19 October 2019.

Ballygunner were the defending champions.

On 13 October 2019, Ballygunner won the championship after a 1-24 to 1-15 defeat of De La Salle in the final. It was their 18th championship title overall and their 6th title in succession.

Ballygunner's Pauric Mahony was the championship's top scorer with 0-69.

Team changes

To Championship

Promoted from the Waterford Intermediate Hurling Championship
 Clonea

From Championship

Relegated to the Waterford Intermediate Hurling Championship
 An Rinn

Results/fixtures

Group A

Table

Group A results

Group B

Table

Group B results

Group C

Table

Group C results

Knock-out stage

Play-offs

Relegation play-offs

Quarter-finals

Semi-finals

Final

Championship statistics

Top scorers

Top scorers overall

Top scorers in a single game

Miscellaneous

 On 28 July 2019, Ballygunner recorded their 30th consecutive championship victory.

References

Waterford Senior Hurling Championship
Waterford